Orchesella villosa is a species of slender springtail in the family Entomobryidae. It is found in Europe, and is an invasive species in North America.

References

Entomobryomorpha
Articles created by Qbugbot
Animals described in 1767
Taxa named by Carl Linnaeus